{{DISPLAYTITLE:C16H18O9}}
The molecular formula C16H18O9 may refer to:

 Chlorogenic acid (3-O-caffeoylquinic acid or 3-CQA)
 Cryptochlorogenic acid (4-O-caffeoylquinic acid or 4-CGA)
 Neochlorogenic acid (5-O-caffeoylquinic acid or 5-CQA)
 Scopolin